John Stuart Farrand (born 1935)  is a British-American business executive.

For fourteen years he worked for a U.K. company, Music Hire Group Limited, and served as managing director beginning in 1973. From 1980 until 1985, he was a senior executive at Warner Communications, which included heading up its Atari Coin-Operated Games Division. During the 1980s, Panavision was sold by Warner Communications to an investment consortium led by Ted Field, John Farrand, and Alan Hirschfield. Five months later, Field and John Farrand bought out the other investors. They sold the company in 1987. 

In 2002 John married Journalist Giselle Fernandez, they had 1 daughter. The two divorced in 2014.

John Farrand became president and chief operating officer of Panavision in 1985, then in 1998 he was promoted to president and CEO of Panavision by
William C. Scott. In 2003, he resigned his positions to pursue other interests. This resignation occurred during efforts by Panasonic to overcome financial losses that were primarily induced by debt.

References

American business executives
Living people
1945 births